| tries = {{#expr:
 + 1 + 4 + 3 + 4 + 2 + 4
 + 4 + 1 + 5 + 1 + 5 + 2
 + 2 + 5 + 1 + 3 + 4 + 3
 + 2 + 4 + 1 + 7 + 1 + 3
 + 4 + 1 + 5 + 4 + 4 + 1
}}
| top point scorer =  Thomas Ramos (84 points)
| top try scorer =  Damian Penaud (5 tries)
| Player of the tournament = 
| previous year = 2022
| previous tournament = 2022 Six Nations Championship
| next year = 2024
| next tournament = 2024 Six Nations Championship
}}
The 2023 Six Nations Championship (known as the Guinness Six Nations for sponsorship reasons) was the 24th Six Nations Championship, an annual rugby union competition contested by the national teams of England, France, Ireland, Italy, Scotland and Wales. It was the 129th edition of the competition (including all its previous incarnations as the Home Nations Championship and Five Nations Championship). France entered the tournament as defending champions, having won the Grand Slam in 2022. 

Ireland won the tournament, their fifteenth, with a Triple Crown, their thirteenth, and a Grand Slam, their fourth, and their first won in Dublin.
In beating England in their final game on 18 March, Ireland completed a full set of consecutive victories over all the other tier-one international sides. In total 91 tries were scored in the Championship, a Championship record.

Participants

Squads

Table 

Table ranking rules
 Four points are awarded for a win.
 Two points are awarded for a draw.
 A bonus point is awarded to a team that scores four or more tries, or loses by seven points or fewer. If a team scores four or more tries, and loses by seven points or fewer, they are awarded both bonus points.
 Three bonus points are awarded to a team that wins all five of their matches (a Grand Slam). This ensures that a Grand Slam winning team would top the table with at least 23 points, as another team could lose one match while winning two bonus points and win the other four matches while winning four bonus points for a maximum of 22 points.
 Tiebreakers
 If two or more teams are tied on table points, the team with the better points difference (points scored less points conceded) is ranked higher.
 If the above tiebreaker fails to separate tied teams, the team that scores the higher number of total tries (including penalty tries) in their matches is ranked higher.
 If two or more teams remain tied after applying the above tiebreakers then those teams will be placed at equal rank; if the tournament has concluded and more than one team is placed first then the title will be shared between them.

Fixtures 
The tournament's fixtures were announced on 20 April 2022. There were no Friday night fixtures. Other than the final weekend, the three kick-off time slots were the same each weekend of the tournament.

Round 1 

Notes:
 Leigh Halfpenny (Wales) was originally named at full-back, but he was replaced by Liam Williams ahead of the match, after suffering a back spasm in training.
 Jamison Gibson-Park (Ireland) was originally named at scrum-half, but withdrew on the day of the match due to injury. He was replaced in the starting line-up by Conor Murray, whose place in the bench was taken by Craig Casey.
 Cian Healy (Ireland) was originally named among the replacements, but withdrew on the day of the match due to injury. His place was taken by Dave Kilcoyne.
 Ireland won at the Millennium Stadium in a Six Nations match for the first time since 2013.

Notes:
 Ollie Hassell-Collins (England) made his international debut.
 Scotland retained the Calcutta Cup.
 Scotland won three consecutive games against England for the first time since 1972, and registered successive away wins against England for the first time since 1909.
With this win, Scotland moved up to fifth in the World Rugby Rankings, equalling their highest position, last set in May 2018.

Notes:
 Edoardo Iachizzi (Italy) and Ethan Dumortier (France) made their international debuts.
 France retained the Giuseppe Garibaldi Trophy.

Round 2 

Notes:
 Dave Kilcoyne, Andrew Porter and James Ryan (all Ireland) earned their 50th international test caps.
 Prior to this game, Ireland were ranked 1st in the men's World Rugby Rankings and France were 2nd, the first time that a Six Nations Championship match had brought the world's top two teams together.
 This was Ireland's 13th consecutive win at home, their longest consecutive run of home victories.
 Ireland brought to an end France's 14-match unbeaten run dating back to  November 2021.

Notes:
 Rhys Davies (Wales) made his international debut.
 Stuart Hogg (Scotland) earned his 100th international cap (98 for Scotland, 2 for the British & Irish Lions).
 This was Scotland's biggest win over Wales, surpassing the 25-point winning margin set in 1924.
 Scotland won back-to-back matches in the opening rounds of the Six Nations for the first time.
 Wales lost their opening two Six Nations games for the first time since 2007.
 Scotland reclaimed the Doddie Weir Cup.

Notes:
 Jack Walker (England) made his international debut.
 Dan Cole (England) earned his 100th international cap (97 for England, 3 for the British & Irish Lions).

Round 3 

Notes:
 Garry Ringrose (Ireland) was originally named to start at outside centre, but withdrew the day before the match due to injury. He was replaced in the starting line-up by Stuart McCloskey, who started at inside centre with Bundee Aki moving to outside centre. McCloskey's place on the bench was taken by Jimmy O'Brien.

Notes:
 Mason Grady (Wales) made his international debut.
 England won in Cardiff for the first time since their 21–16 victory in 2017.
 Wales fell to tenth in the World Rugby Rankings, equalling their worst-ever placement.

Notes:
 France retained the Auld Alliance Trophy.
 Mohamed Haouas (France) became the first player to receive two career red cards in Six Nations Championship matches, his first also coming against Scotland in 2020.
 This was the 100th meeting between France and Scotland.

Round 4 

Notes:
 France won against England at Twickenham for the first time since 2007, and in a Six Nations match at Twickenham for the first time since 2005.
 France scored their most points against England (previously 37 points in 1972) to set a new record winning margin over England (previously 25 last set in 2006).
 This was England's heaviest defeat at home (43-point difference), surpassing the 36 points to South Africa in 2008, and is the most points they've conceded at home, surpassing the 42 points conceded in the same game.
 This was England's heaviest defeat in any Home, Five or Six Nations match, surpassing the 43–13 loss to Ireland in 2007, and the most points conceded (surpassing the same game).

Notes:
 Stuart Hogg (Scotland) became the fourth Scotsman to earn his 100th test cap for Scotland.
 Garry Ringrose (Ireland) earned his 50th international test cap.
 Johnny Sexton (Ireland) matched Ronan O'Gara's record as the leading point scorer in Six Nations Championship (557 points).
 Ireland retained the Centenary Quaich.
 Ireland become the first team to record 80 wins across all editions of the Six Nations Championship.

Round 5 

Notes:
 Ben Healy (Scotland), and Simone Gesi and Marco Manfredi (both Italy) made their international debuts.
 Tommaso Menoncello (Italy) had been named to start but withdrew ahead of the game and was replaced by Luca Morisi and Marco Zanon replaced Morisi on the bench.
 Scotland retained the Cuttitta Cup.

Notes:
 Taulupe Faletau (Wales) became the eighth Welshman to earn 100 test caps for Wales.
 Uini Atonio (France) and Dillon Lewis  (Wales) earned their 50th test caps.
 France scored their most points against Wales when at home, surpassing the 38 points scored in 2020.
 George North (Wales) surpassed Shane Williams's record of 22 Six Nations tries to become Wales' top try scorer in the Six Nations.
 France surpass their record of 18 tries scored in a Six Nations campaign set in 2006 and 2021 and surpass their own record of 156 points scored in a campaign set in 2002.
 Wales surpass their worst defensive record in a Six Nations campaign, conceding a total of 19 tries. It was previously 18 tries conceded in 2002.

Notes:
 Dan Cole (England) became the fourth Englishman to earn 100 test caps for England.
 Josh van der Flier (Ireland) earned his 50th test cap.
 Ireland won the Championship for the fifteenth time and a Grand Slam for the fourth time, their first home Grand Slam since 1948 and a home Championship since 1985.
 Ireland became the first team to win the Triple Crown in back-to-back consecutive years since they last did it in 2006 and 2007.
 Ireland became the first nation to see their senior mens side and under-20's side win the Grand Slam in the same year.
 Johnny Sexton (Ireland) surpassed Ronan O'Gara's record of 557 points scored in the Six Nations to become the competition's all-time leading point scorer.
 Ireland retained the Millennium Trophy.

Player statistics

Most points

Most tries

Broadcasting

In the United Kingdom, each game was broadcast live on a free-to-air terrestrial TV channel, either the BBC or ITV, as a result of a new deal covering the four years from 2022 to 2025. All of Wales' games were also broadcast on S4C in the Welsh language

In the Republic of Ireland, all games were shown free-to-air on either RTÉ or Virgin Media under the terms of the new TV rights share.

References 

 
2023
2023 rugby union tournaments for national teams
2022–23 in European rugby union
2022–23 in Irish rugby union
2022–23 in English rugby union
2022–23 in Welsh rugby union
2022–23 in Scottish rugby union
2022–23 in French rugby union
2022–23 in Italian rugby union
February 2023 sports events in Europe
March 2023 sports events in Europe